Cardwellia is a monotypic genus in the plant family Proteaceae. The sole described species is Cardwellia sublimis − commonly known as northern silky oak, bull oak or lacewood − which is endemic to the rainforests of northeastern Queensland, Australia.

Description
The bark is thin and there is usually no buttressing. The leaves are alternate, dark green above with a silvery brown sheen below. On seedlings the leaves are simple but on mature trees they are pinnately compound, and there is a graduation of the leaf morphology as the tree grows (see gallery).

They are produced above the tree canopy, and prolific − the canopy can be covered with the cream-white flowerheads in late spring and summer.

They split along one side to release the seeds, and will persist for some time both on the tree and on the ground after they have fallen.

Taxonomy and naming
The Victorian colonial botanist Ferdinand von Mueller first described this species in 1865 based on material collected by John Dallachy in Rockingham Bay. It was published in his work Fragmenta Phytographiae Australiae

Phylogeny
Molecular analysis indicates Cardwellia sublimis is a member of the subtribe Gevuininae, and is the earliest offshoot from the main ancestor of the other genera. It is thought to have separated around 35 million years ago in the late Eocene.

Etymology
Mueller created the genus name in honour of Edward Cardwell, who was Secretary of State for the Colonies from 1864 to 1866. The species name that he chose is the Latin adjective sublimis, with the meanings uplifted, high, lofty, exalted, or sublime − it may possibly be a reference to the fruit (which is held above the tree's canopy) or to the height of the tree itself.

Common names
The name for this tree in the Dyirbal language is jungan. The more general word gurruŋun is used in their taboo vocabulary, and is also applied to Darlingia ferruginea and Helicia australasica. In the English language, the common names "bull oak" and "northern silky oak" arose in colonial times and are references to the similarity of the grain of its timber to that of the oaks of England and Europe that were more familiar to the colonists.

Distribution and habitat
Cardwellia sublimis is endemic to a small part of northeastern Queensland, occurring from the area around Rossville south to the Paluma Range National Park, and from the coastal flats to the adjacent ranges and tablelands.

Ecology
Ants (Formicidae) are known to create wounds on the trunk of the northern silky oak by biting it, in order to access and consume the sugary sap. The seeds are eaten by sulphur-crested cockatoos (Cacatua galerita) and native rats.

Conservation
The northern silky oak has been assessed as least concern by both the Queensland Department of Environment and Science and the International Union for Conservation of Nature (IUCN). The IUCN states in its assessment summary that the "species was heavy logged in the past but this has stopped. Currently, the species has no immediate threats".

Uses and cultivation
Cardwellia sublimis was harvested extensively in the past for its highly-regarded timber, which was widely used in houses of the traditional "Queenslander" style, especially for windows. It was also commonly used for furniture, joinery and flooring. In limited supply today, it is now used mostly for cabinet work and veneers

Attempts to grow Cardwellia sublimis in plantations have not been very successful, however it has good potential as a park and street tree due to its large size, attractive foliage and showy flowering displays. It is readily propagated from seed (although seed must be fresh, stored for less than 6 weeks) and has been grown successfully in Melbourne.

Gallery

References

External links
 
 
 View a map of historical sightings of this species at the Australasian Virtual Herbarium
 View observations of this species on iNaturalist
 View images of this species on Flickriver

Proteaceae
Endemic flora of Queensland
Proteales of Australia
Monotypic Proteaceae genera
Taxa named by Ferdinand von Mueller
Wet Tropics of Queensland